James B. Johnson (born 1944) is an American author of science fiction novels.

Novels
1981 - Daystar and Shadow
1987 - Trekmaster (Published as "Treckmeister" in Germany.)
1988 - Mindhopper
1989 - Habu
1991 - A World Lost
2011 - Counterclockwise

References

External links

1944 births
20th-century American novelists
American male novelists
American science fiction writers
Living people
20th-century American male writers